Sky Angkor Airlines Inc., formerly Skywings Asia Airlines is an airline based in Cambodia. Its main hub is at Siem Reap International Airport and Phnom Penh International Airport.

History

Founded in 2010, Skywings Asia Airlines received its 'Approval of Foreign International Transportation Business'. The airline is a joint venture of Korean and Cambodian investors with s focus on the Korean travel market.

On 13 June 2011, it had its inaugural flight on the route Siem Reap - Seoul-Incheon - Hanoi - Siem Reap using a McDonnell Douglas MD-83 aircraft. The airline added its first Airbus A320 in July of the same year.

On 30 November 2014, Skywings Asia Airlines formally ceased operations and rebranded as Sky Angkor Airlines. Since rebranding the airline now flies many scheduled and charter flights to and from Cambodia to countries including China, Japan, South Korea and Vietnam.

On 23 April 2022, Sky Angkor Airlines announced daily flight from Phnom Penh to Bangkok and Siem Reap with Airbus A321-200 start from 6 May 2022.

Destinations
Sky Angkor Airlines serves the following destinations:

Fleet

Current fleet

As of February 2023, the Sky Angkor Airlines fleet consists of the following aircraft:

Former fleet
Sky Angkor Airlines, as well as Skywings Asia Airlines, previously operated the following aircraft as of November 2017:

See also
 Air transport in Cambodia
 List of airlines of Cambodia

References

External links

Airlines of Cambodia
Airlines established in 2011
Cambodian companies established in 2011